Jumbo: The Plane that Changed the World, also known as 747: The Jumbo Revolution is a British documentary that was broadcast on BBC Two on 27 February 2014. The documentary, written and directed by Christopher Spencer, is about the development of the Boeing 747 jumbo jet.

Cast
Jullian Littman as Joe Sutter
Stuart Saunders as William McPherson Allen
David Peart as Juan Trippe
Eric Meyers as Jack Waddell
Alexandra Metaxa as Emilia de Geer

Production
The documentary was commissioned by the BBC and is a co-production with Smithsonian Channel and Discovery Canada. The Smithsonian Channel will broadcast it as a two-hour episode with the title 747: The Jumbo Revolution. The production company is Arrow Media and the distributor is TCB Media.

Reception
The Guardian called it a television highlight of the day. Overnight figures show that the documentary was watched by 1.34 million viewers in the United Kingdom, with a 5.9% audience share.

References

External links
 
 

2014 in British television
BBC television documentaries
English-language television shows
Documentary television series about aviation
Boeing 747